This is list of archives in Paraguay.

Archives in Paraguay 

 Archivo Nacional de Asunción
 Archives of Terror

See also 

 List of archives
 List of libraries in Paraguay
 List of museums in Paraguay
 Culture of Paraguay

External links 
 General Archives (all)

 
Archives
Paraguay
Archives